RTAudio is a Microsoft produced adaptive wide-band speech codec. It is used by Microsoft Office Communications Server (OCS) and the related OCS clients (Microsoft Office Communicator, and Microsoft Live Meeting Console).

RTAudio was designed for real-time two-way Voice over IP (VoIP) applications.  Some of the target applications include games, audio conferencing, and wireless applications over IP. RTAudio is the preferred Microsoft Real-Time audio codec, and is the default voice codec for Microsoft’s Unified Communications platforms. 

The RTAudio encoder is capable of encoding single-channel (mono), 16 bit per sample audio signals. The encoder can be configured to operate either in the Narrow Band mode (8 kHz sampling rate) or the Wide Band mode (16 kHz sampling rate). The RTAudio decoder has a built-in jitter control module as well as an error concealment module.

Licensing 
RTAudio is a proprietary codec. Like RTVideo, this protocol can also be licensed from Microsoft.

External links
Overview of the Microsoft RTAudio Speech codec

Audio codecs
Speech codecs
Microsoft proprietary codecs
Wideband codecs